Max Brown may refer to:
Max Brown (English actor) (born 1981), English actor
Max Brown (baseball) (born 1993), New Zealand outfielder
Max Brown (footballer) (born 1999), English footballer
Max Brown (novelist)  (1916–2003), Australian novelist
Max Brown (rugby league) (born 1946), Australian rugby league footballer
Max Brown (politician) (died 2012), Australian politician
Max Brown (Australian actor), Australian actor

See also
Maxwell Brown (disambiguation)
Max Browne (born 1995), American football player